Tiantong Zongjue, was a Chinese Zen Buddhist monk during the Song Dynasty. He was born in Hezhou, but left home to practice Buddhism at the age of sixteen. His ordination took place two years later. Zuzhao Daohe of the Yunmen School was his first teacher. However, Daohe retired and was replaced by Zhenxie Qingliao of the Caodong/Sōtō School, who became the teacher that gave Zongjue dharma transmission. In 1132, Zongjue became the abbot of Yuelin Temple where he served for 23 years. After this period, his abbacy switched to Mt. Xuedou. He remained there for four years before becoming the abbot of Tiantong Monastery near the modern city of Ningbo in 1159. He was replacing the former abbot, the famous Hongzhi Zhengjue, who died there in 1157. It was from this final temple, where Zongjue died in 1162, that he took his name. Tiantong temple was the same monastery where Eihei Dogen studied under Tiantong Rujing before bringing the teaching back to Japan and founding the Sōtō School.

References

Chan Buddhist monks
1091 births
1162 deaths
Song dynasty Buddhist monks
 Chinese Zen Buddhists
People from Hezhou